Venancio Concepción was a Filipino general under the leadership of President Emilio Aguinaldo. He fought battles in Iloilo and Central Luzon. However, President Aguinaldo, just hours after Antonio Luna's death on June 5, 1899, relieved Luna's officers and men from the field, including General Concepción, whose headquarters in Angeles, Pampanga Aguinaldo besieged the same day Luna was assassinated. During the American period, in 1918, he was appointed as the first Filipino president of the Philippine National Bank, the first universal bank in the Philippines, by the American Governor-General of the Philippines Francis Burton Harrison. He succeeded Henry Parker Willis, who was then appointed director of research of the Federal Reserve Board of Governors. However, in 1920, he was tried and convicted of fraud.

References

Kapampangan people
Filipino generals
Filipino bankers
Year of birth missing
Year of death missing
Members of the Malolos Congress